Bull Creek District Park is a  city park in Austin, Texas. The park was created in 1971, and named for Bull Creek, the stream that passes through it and provides the focal point of the park's primary attractions of swimming, hiking, and fishing.

In addition to the natural habitat, there is also a basketball court, a volleyball court, and one multipurpose field. The park is also popular with rock climbers, who practice on the large limestone ridges, and the park is currently on-leash (for dogs).

In 2012, Austin's Parks and Recreation Department initiated the creation of a master plan for further park development. Plan completion was expected in 2016, with design and construction pending.

References

Parks in Austin, Texas